Dordrecht Hospital is a Provincial government funded hospital in the Emalahleni Municipality, situated in Dordrecht, Eastern Cape in South Africa. Previously, it was a Provincially Aided Hospital (until December 2010).

The hospital departments include Emergency department, Out Patients Department, Paediatric ward, Maternity ward, Surgical Services, Medical Services, Operating Theatre & CSSD Services, Pharmacy, Anti-Retroviral (ARV) treatment for HIV/AIDS, Post Trauma Counseling Services, Laundry Services, Kitchen Services and Mortuary.

References 
 Eastern Cape Department of Health website - Chris Hani District Hospitals

Hospitals in the Eastern Cape
Emalahleni Local Municipality, Eastern Cape